Several United States post offices are individually notable and have operated under the authority of the United States Post Office Department (1792–1971) or of the United States Postal Service (since 1971).  Notable U.S. post offices include individual buildings, whether still in service or not, which have architectural or community-related significance.  Many of these are listed on the National Register of Historic Places (NRHP) and/or state and local historic registers.

Alabama 
 
 United States Post Office (Albertville, Alabama), listed on the National Register of Historic Places (NRHP)
 United States Post Office (Anniston, Alabama), NRHP-listed
 Old Athens, Alabama Main Post Office in Athens, NRHP-listed
 United States Post Office (Attalla, Alabama), NRHP-listed
 Auburn City Hall, in Auburn, formerly the "U.S. Post Office", NRHP-listed
 Robert S. Vance Federal Building and United States Courthouse, Birmingham, Alabama, formerly known as "U.S. Post Office"
 United States Post Office (Burbank, Alabama) 
 United States Post Office (Demopolis, Alabama)
 Federal Building and United States Courthouse (Dothan, Alabama), also a post office
 United States Post Office (Fairhope, Alabama)
 United States Post Office (Gadsden, Alabama)
 Post Office Historic District, Greenville, Alabama
 United States Courthouse and Post Office (Huntsville, Alabama)
 Frank M. Johnson Jr. Federal Building and United States Courthouse, Montgomery, Alabama, listed on the NRHP as United States Post Office and Courthouse-Montgomery
 United States Post Office (Opelika, Alabama)
 United States Post Office Building (Selma, Alabama)

Alaska 

 Cordova Post Office and Courthouse, NRHP-listed
 Cooper Landing Post Office, NRHP-listed
 Sitka United States Post Office and Court House, NRHP-listed

Arizona 
 United States Post Office and Customs House-Douglas Main, Douglas, Arizona
 United States Post Office and Courthouse-Globe Main
 U.S. Post Office (Kingman, Arizona)
 U.S. Post Office and Immigration Station–Nogales Main
 United States Post Office, American Flag, Arizona, in Pinal County
 United States Post Office (Phoenix, Arizona)
 United States Post Office and Courthouse–Prescott Main, Prescott, Arizona
 James A. Walsh United States Courthouse, Tucson, Arizona, NRHP-listed as U.S. Post Office and Courthouse
 Old Brick Post Office, in Maricopa County
 United States Post Office–Yuma Main

Arkansas 

 Berryville Post Office, in Berryville, in Carroll County, NRHP-listed
 Old Camden Post Office in Camden, in Ouachita County, NRHP-listed
 Crossett Post Office, in Crossett, in Ashley County, NRHP-listed
 Dardanelle Agriculture and Post Office, in Dardanelle, in Yell County, NRHP-listed
 DeWitt Post Office, in DeWitt, in Arkansas County, NRHP-listed
 Old Post Office (Fayetteville, Arkansas), NRHP-listed
 Doe Branch Post Office, in Ferndale, in Pulaski County, NRHP-listed
 Judge Isaac C. Parker Federal Building, in Fort Smith, NRHP-listed, also known as "U.S. Post Office and Courthouse", Fort Smith, Arkansas
 Old Post Office (Hot Springs, Arkansas), [in Garland County, NRHP-listed
 Lake Village Post Office, in Lake Village, in Chicot County, NRHP-listed
 Little Rock United States Post Office and Courthouse, in Little Rock, NRHP-listed
 Old Post Office Building and Customhouse (Little Rock, Arkansas), NRHP-listed
 Old Post Office (Mena, Arkansas), in Polk County, NRHP-listed
 Monticello Post Office, in Monticello, in Drew County, NRHP-listed
 Morrilton Post Office, in Morrilton, in Conway County, NRHP-listed
 North Little Rock Post Office, in North Little Rock, in Pulaski County, NRHP-listed
 Nashville Post Office, in Nashville, in Howard County, NRHP-listed
 Campbell Post Office-Kuykendall General Store, in Oxley, in Searcy County, NRHP-listed
 Paris Post Office, in Paris, in Logan County, NRHP-listed
 Piggott Post Office, in Piggott, in Clay County, NRHP-listed
 Pocahontas Post Office, in Pocahontas, in Randolph County, NRHP-listed
 Searcy Post Office, in Searcy, in White County, NRHP-listed
 United States Post Office-Stuttgart, in Stuttgart, in Arkansas County, NRHP-listed
 United States Post Office and Courthouse (Texarkana, Arkansas-Texas), NRHP-listed
 Van Buren Post Office, in Van Buren, in Crawford County, NRHP-listed
 Old Walnut Ridge Post Office, in Walnut Ridge, in Lawrence County, NRHP-listed
 Warren Post Office, in Warren, in Bradley County, NRHP-listed
 Wynne Post Office, in Wynne, in Cross County, NRHP-listed

California

 United States Post Office (Berkeley, California), NRHP-listed
 United States Post Office-Beverly Hills Main, in Beverly Hills, listed on the NRHP in Los Angeles County
 United States Post Office-Burbank Downtown Station, in Burbank, listed on the NRHP in Los Angeles County
 Chico Midtown Station, in Chico, listed on the NRHP as "US Post Office"
 United States Post Office-El Centro Main, in El Centro, listed on the NRHP in Imperial County
 United States Post Office and Courthouse (Eureka, California)
 United States Post Office-Glendale Main, in Glendale, listed on the NRHP in Los Angeles
 United States Post Office (Hollywood, California), NRHP-listed
 United States Post Office-Oroville Main, in Oroville, listed on the NRHP in Butte
 United States Post Office (Petaluma, California), in Petaluma, NRHP-listed in Sonoma County
 United States Post Office-Porterville Main, in Porterville, listed on the NRHP in Tulare County
 La Jolla Post Office, San Diego, listed on the NRHP in San Diego County
 United States Post Office-Long Beach Main, in Long Beach, NRHP-listed
 United States Court House (Los Angeles, 1940), listed on the NRHP as "US Court House and Post Office"
 United States Post Office – Los Angeles Terminal Annex, in Los Angeles, NRHP-listed
 United States Post Office-Marysville Main, in Marysville, listed on the NRHP in Yuba County
 United States Post Office (Merced, California), listed on the NRHP in Merced County
 United States Post Office (Modesto, California), listed on the NRHP in Stanislaus County
 United States Post Office-Napa Franklin Station, in Napa, listed on the NRHP in Napa County
 Main Post Office and Federal Building (Oakland, California), listed on the NRHP in Alameda County
 United States Post Office (Palo Alto, California), listed on the NRHP in Santa Clara County
United States Post Office (Redlands, California), NRHP-listed
 Federal Post Office (Riverside, California), in Riverside, listed on the NRHP in Riverside County
 United States Post Office, Courthouse and Federal Building (Sacramento, California)
San Bernardino Downtown Station, NRHP-listed
 United States Post Office-Downtown Station (San Diego, California), in San Diego, listed on the NRHP in San Diego County
 Ferry Station Post Office Building, in San Francisco, listed on the NRHP in San Francisco
 James R. Browning United States Court of Appeals Building, San Francisco, listed on the NRHP as U.S. Post Office and Courthouse
 United States Post Office (San Pedro, California)
 United States Post Office Station-Spurgeon Station, in Santa Ana, listed on the NRHP in Orange County
 United States Post Office-Santa Barbara Main, in Santa Barbara, listed on the NRHP in Santa Barbara County
 United States Post Office-Santa Cruz Main, in Santa Cruz, listed on the NRHP in Santa Cruz County
 Old Post Office (Santa Rosa, California), listed on the NRHP in Sonoma County
 United States Post Office (Stockton, California), listed on the NRHP in San Joaquin County
 United States Post Office-Visalia Town Center Station, in Visalia, CA, listed on the NRHP in Tulare County
 United States Post Office-Willows Main, in Willows, listed on the NRHP in Glenn County

Colorado

 United States Post Office-Boulder Main, in Boulder, CO, listed on the NRHP in Boulder County
 United States Post Office and Federal Building-Canon City Main, in Canon City, CO, listed on the NRHP in Fremont County
 United States Post Office and Federal Courthouse-Colorado Springs Main, in Colorado Springs, CO, listed on the NRHP in El Paso County
 United States Post Office and Federal Building-Delta Main, in Delta, CO, listed on the NRHP in Delta County
 Byron White United States Courthouse, listed on the NRHP in Downtown Denver as U.S. Post Office and Federal Building
 Florence Post Office, in Florence, Colorado, NRHP-listed in Fremont County
 Fort Collins Post Office, in Fort Collins, CO, listed on the NRHP in Larimer County
 United States Post Office-Fort Morgan Main, in Fort Morgan, CO, listed on the NRHP in Morgan County
 Wildhack's Grocery Store-Post Office, in Frisco, CO, listed on the NRHP in Summit County
 United States Post Office (Grand Junction, Colorado), listed on the NRHP in Mesa County
 United States Post Office (La Junta, Colorado), listed on the NRHP in Otero County
 Las Animas Post Office, in Las Animas, CO, listed on the NRHP in Bent County
 United States Post Office-Lamar Main, in Lamar, CO, listed on the NRHP in Prowers County
 United States Post Office-Manitou Springs Main, in Manitou Springs, CO, listed on the NRHP in El Paso County
 United States Post Office and Federal Building-Monte Vista Main, in Monte Vista, CO, listed on the NRHP in Rio Grande County
 United States Post Office-Montrose Main, in Montrose, CO, listed on the NRHP in Montrose County
 United States Post Office (Rifle, Colorado), in Rifle, Colorado, NRHP-listed in Garfield County
 United States Post Office, Federal Building, and Federal Courthouse-Sterling Main, in Sterling, CO, listed on the NRHP in Logan County
 United States Post Office-Trinidad Main, in Trinidad, CO, listed on the NRHP in Las Animas County

Connecticut 

 United States Post Office–Ansonia Main, in Ansonia, Connecticut
 United States Post Office–Bridgeport Main, in Bridgeport, Connecticut
 United States Post Office (Greenwich, Connecticut)
 William R. Cotter Federal Building, Hartford, Connecticut, NRHP-listed as U.S. Post Office and Federal Building
 United States Post Office–Norwich Main, in Norwich, Connecticut
 United States Post Office–Manchester Main, in Manchester, Connecticut
 United States Post Office–Meriden Main, in Meriden, Connecticut
 Old Middletown Post Office, Middletown, Connecticut, NRHP-listed as U.S. Post Office
 United States Post Office–Milford Main, in Milford, Connecticut
 United States Post Office–Naugatuck Main, in Naugatuck, Connecticut
 United States Post Office-New London Main, in New London, Connecticut
 United States Post Office-South Norwalk Main, in Norwalk, Connecticut
 United States Post Office-Stamford Main, in Stamford, Connecticut
 United States Post Office (Westport, Connecticut), in Westport, Connecticut

Delaware 
 Kenton Post Office, in Kenton, NRHP-listed
 United States Post Office, Courthouse, and Customhouse (Wilmington, Delaware), NRHP-listed

Florida 

 Cleveland Street Post Office, Clearwater, Florida, NRHP-listed
 United States Post Office (Daytona Beach, Florida), NRHP-listed
 El Jobean Post Office and General Store, El Jobean, Florida
 Evinston Community Store and Post Office, Evinston, Florida
 Old Fort Pierce Post Office, Fort Pierce, Florida
 U.S. Post Office, Gainesville, Florida, listed on the NRHP as U.S. Post Office
 Mandarin Store and Post Office, Jacksonville, Florida
 Old Post Office and Customshouse (Key West, Florida)
 Old Eau Gallie Post Office, in the Eau Gallie section of Melbourne
 David W. Dyer Federal Building and United States Courthouse, Miami, listed on the NRHP as U.S. Post Office and Courthouse
 Old United States Post Office and Courthouse (Miami, Florida)
 Ochopee Post Office, Ochopee, Florida – the smallest post office in the United States
 United States Post Office (Palm Beach, Florida)
 Palm City Post Office, Palm City, FL
 United States Customs House and Post Office (Pensacola, Florida)
 Old Perry Post Office, Perry, Florida
 United States Post Office (St. Petersburg, Florida)
 United States Post Office-Federal Building (Sarasota, Florida)
 Stuart Post Office, Stuart, FL 
 United States Courthouse Building and Downtown Postal Station (Tampa, Florida)

Georgia

 United States Post Office–Adel, Georgia
 United States Post Office and Courthouse (Albany, Georgia)
 Elbert P. Tuttle United States Court of Appeals Building, Atlanta, listed on the NRHP as U.S. Post Office and Courthouse
 United States Post Office, Federal Annex, in Atlanta, listed on the NRHP in Fulton County
 United States Post Office and Courthouse (Augusta, Georgia)
 United States Post Office-Baxley, Georgia, in Baxley, listed on the NRHP in Appling County
 Cassville Post Office, in Cassville, GA, listed on the NRHP in Bartow County
 U.S. Post Office (Carrollton, Georgia), listed on the NRHP in Carroll County
 United States Post Office and Courthouse (Columbus, Georgia)
 United States Post Office-Cordele, in Cordele, Georgia, listed on the NRHP in Crisp County
 United States Post Office-Decatur, Georgia, in Decatur, Georgia, listed on the NRHP in DeKalb County
 Woodall-Patton House and Post Office, in Ellaville, Georgia, listed on the NRHP in Schley County
Jakin Post Office, formerly the "Bank of Jakin", in Jakin, Georgia, NRHP-listed
 Old U.S. Post Office and Federal Building (Macon, Georgia), NRHP-listed
 United States Post Office and Courthouse (Rome, Georgia)
 United States Post Office-Rossville Main, in Rossville, Georgia, listed on the NRHP in Walker County
 United States Post Office-Statesboro, in Statesboro, Georgia, listed on the NRHP in Bulloch County
 United States Post Office-Sylvester, in Sylvester, Georgia, listed on the NRHP in Worth County
 United States Post Office and Courthouse (Waycross, Georgia)

Hawaii 
 Federal Building, United States Post Office and Courthouse (Hilo, Hawaii)
 Kamehameha V Post Office, Honolulu
 King David Kalakaua Building, Honolulu, Hawaii, formerly known as U.S. Post Office, Customhouse, and Courthouse
 United States Post Office–Lihue, on Kauai

Idaho
 United States Post Office–Blackfoot Main, Blackfoot, Idaho
 Bonners Ferry Main Post Office, in Bonners Ferry, Idaho, NRHP-listed
 United States Post Office-Buhl Main, in Buhl, Idaho, listed on the NRHP in Twin Falls County
 United States Post Office-Caldwell Main, in Caldwell, Idaho, listed on the NRHP in Canyon County
 United States Post Office (Idaho Falls, Idaho), listed on the NRHP in Bonneville County
 United States Post Office-Kellogg Main, in Kellogg, Idaho, listed on the NRHP in Shoshone County
 Moscow Post Office and Courthouse, Moscow, Idaho
 United States Post Office-Nampa Main, in Nampa, Idaho, listed on the NRHP in Canyon County
 United States Post Office-Orofino Main, in Orofino, Idaho, listed on the NRHP in Clearwater County
 United States Post Office-Payette Main, in Payette, Idaho, listed on the NRHP in Payette County
 United States Post Office-Preston Main, in Preston, Idaho, listed on the NRHP in Franklin County
 United States Post Office-St. Anthony Main, in St. Anthony, Idaho, listed on the NRHP in Fremont County
 United States Post Office-Wallace Main, in Wallace, Idaho, listed on the NRHP in Shoshone County
 Weiser Post Office, in Weiser, Idaho, listed on the NRHP in Washington County
 Wickahoney Post Office and Stage Station, in Wickahoney, Idaho, listed on the NRHP in Owyhee County

Illinois 
 United States Post Office (Belvidere, Illinois), NRHP-listed
 United States Post Office (Champaign, Illinois), NRHP-listed
 Old Chicago Main Post Office, in Chicago
 United States Post Office (Joliet, Illinois), NRHP-listed
 United States Post Office (Mattoon, Illinois), NRHP-listed
 United States Post Office and Courthouse (Quincy, Illinois), NRHP-listed
 United States Post Office (Sycamore, Illinois), NRHP-listed

Indiana 
 United States Post Office (Brazil, Indiana)
 Evansville Post Office
 E. Ross Adair Federal Building and United States Courthouse in Fort Wayne
 Birch Bayh Federal Building and United States Courthouse in Indianapolis
 Michigan City Post Office
 Rickenbaugh House in Celina
 Terre Haute Post Office and Federal Building
Brooklyn Post Office

Paradise Lake Post Office

Iowa 

 Cedar Rapids Post Office and Public Building
 United States Post Office (Centerville, Iowa)
 United States Post Office (Creston, Iowa)
 United States Post Office and Court House (Davenport, Iowa)
 United States Post Office (Des Moines, Iowa)
 Former United States Post Office Building (Fairfield, Iowa)
 Old Post Office (Iowa City, Iowa)
 United States Post Office (Iowa Falls, Iowa)
 United States Post Office and Courthouse (Keokuk, Iowa)
 United States Post Office (Ottumwa, Iowa)
 Kegler Gonner Store and Post Office, in Springbrook
 Webster City Post Office

Kansas
 Atchison Post Office, in Atchison, KS, listed on the NRHP in Kansas
 United States Post Office-Anthony, in Anthony, KS, listed on the NRHP in Kansas
 United States Post Office-Augusta, in Augusta, KS, listed on the NRHP in Kansas
 United States Post Office-Belleville, in Belleville, KS, listed on the NRHP in Kansas
 United States Post Office-Burlington, in Burlington, KS, listed on the NRHP in Kansas
 United States Post Office-Caldwell, in Caldwell, KS, listed on the NRHP in Kansas
 United States Post Office-Council Grove, in Council Grove, KS, listed on the NRHP in Kansas
 United States Post Office-Eureka, in Eureka, KS, listed on the NRHP in Kansas
 United States Post Office-Fredonia, Kansas, in Fredonia, KS, listed on the NRHP in Kansas
 United States Post Office-Goodland, in Goodland, KS, listed on the NRHP in Kansas
 United States Post Office-Halstead, in Halstead, KS, listed on the NRHP in Kansas
 United States Post Office-Herington, in Herington, KS, listed on the NRHP in Kansas
 United States Post Office-Horton, in Horton, KS, listed on the NRHP in Kansas
 United States Post Office-Hutchinson, in Hutchinson, KS, listed on the NRHP in Kansas
 Federal Building-United States Post Office (Independence, Kansas), in Independence, KS, listed on the NRHP in Kansas
 United States Post Office-Kingman, in Kingman, KS, listed on the NRHP in Kansas
 United States Post Office-Lawrence, in Lawrence, KS, listed on the NRHP in Kansas
 United States Post Office-Hoisington, in Hoisington, KS, listed on the NRHP in Kansas
 United States Post Office-Lindsborg
 United States Post Office-Neodesha, in Neodesha, KS, listed on the NRHP in Kansas
 United States Post Office-Oswego, in Oswego, KS, listed on the NRHP in Kansas
 United States Post Office-Russell, in Russell, KS, listed on the NRHP in Kansas
 United States Post Office-Sabetha, in Sabetha, KS, listed on the NRHP in Kansas
 United States Post Office and Federal Building-Salina, in Salina, KS, listed on the NRHP in Kansas
 United States Post Office-Seneca, in Seneca, KS, listed on the NRHP in Kansas
 United States Post Office and Federal Building (Wichita, Kansas)

Kentucky
 United States Post Office-Ashland, in Ashland, KY, listed on the NRHP in Kentucky
 Callis General Store and Post Office, in Bedford, KY, listed on the NRHP in Kentucky
 Belleview Post Office, in Belleview, KY, listed on the NRHP in Kentucky
 United States Post Office-Bronston, in Bronston, KY, listed on the NRHP in Kentucky
 Bryantsville Post Office and Store, in Bryantsville, KY, listed on the NRHP in Kentucky
 Dabney Post Office, in Dabney, KY, listed on the NRHP in Kentucky
 United States Post Office-Elizabethtown, in Elizabethtown, KY, listed on the NRHP in Kentucky
 Old United States Courthouse and Post Office (Frankfort, Kentucky)
 United States Post Office/Board of Education Building, in Glasgow, KY, listed on the NRHP in Kentucky
 United States Post Office-Harrodsburg, in Harrodsburg, KY, listed on the NRHP in Kentucky
 Jackson Post Office, in Jackson, KY, listed on the NRHP in Kentucky
 United States Post Office and Court House (Lexington, Kentucky)
 Gene Snyder United States Courthouse, listed on the NRHP in Downtown Louisville as United States Post Office, Court House and Custom House
 Old United States Customshouse and Post Office (Louisville, Kentucky)
 United States Post Office-Madisonville, in Madisonville, KY, listed on the NRHP in Kentucky
 United States Post Office (Mayfield, Kentucky), listed on the NRHP in Kentucky
 United States Post Office-Murray, in Murray, KY, listed on the NRHP in Kentucky
 Federal Building and US Post Office-Owensboro, in Owensboro, KY, listed on the NRHP in Kentucky
 United States Post Office-Prestonsburg, in Prestonsburg, KY, listed on the NRHP in Kentucky
 Willisburg Central Bank and Post Office, in Willisburg, KY, listed on the NRHP in Kentucky

Louisiana
 United States Post Office and Courthouse–Alexandria
 United States Post Office and Courthouse–Baton Rouge
 Old Post Office (Baton Rouge, Louisiana), listed on the NRHP in Louisiana
 Adam Ponthieu Store-Big Bend Post Office, in Big Bend, LA, listed on the NRHP in Louisiana
 United States Post Office (Bogalusa, Louisiana), listed on the NRHP in Louisiana
 Jennings Post Office, in Jennings, Louisiana, listed on the NRHP in Louisiana
 United States Post Office (Mansfield, Louisiana), listed on the NRHP in Louisiana
 United States Post Office (Morgan City, Louisiana), listed on the NRHP in Louisiana
 Star Hill Post Office and Store, St. Francisville, Louisiana, listed on the NRHP in Louisiana
 United States Post Office (St. Martinville, Louisiana), listed on the NRHP in Louisiana
 United States Post Office and Courthouse (Shreveport, Louisiana)

Maine
 Old Post Office (Augusta, Maine), listed on the NRHP in Maine
 United States Post Office-Bar Harbor Maine, in Bar Harbor, listed on the NRHP in Maine
 United States Customhouse and Post Office (Bath, Maine)
 U.S. Post Office (Biddeford, Maine), listed on the NRHP in Maine
 United States Post Office-Camden Maine, in Camden, listed on the NRHP in Maine
 East Blue Hill Post Office, in East Blue Hill, listed on the NRHP in Maine
 United States Post Office-Lewiston Maine, Lewiston
 Old Post Office (Liberty, Maine)
 Machias Post Office and Customhouse, Machias
 United States Post Office-Old Town Maine, in Old Town, listed on the NRHP in Maine
 United States Post Office-Orono Maine, in Orono, listed on the NRHP in Maine
 Post Office, Portland, Maine, designed by Alfred B. Mullett, demolished in 1965
 United States Post Office-Presque Isle Maine, in Presque Isle, listed on the NRHP in Maine
 United States Post Office-Sanford Maine, in Sanford, listed on the NRHP in Maine
 United States Customhouse and Post Office (Waldoboro, Maine), listed on the NRHP in Maine
 Waterville Post Office, in Waterville, listed on the NRHP in Maine
 United States Customhouse (Old Customhouse) and Post Office, Wiscasset
 Early Post Office, in Wells, listed on the NRHP in Maine

Maryland
 United States Post Office and Courthouse (Baltimore, Maryland)
 United States Post Office (College Park, Maryland), a contributing property in the Calvert Hills Historic District
 United States Post Office–Hyattsville Main, Hyattsville

Massachusetts 
 United States Post Office (Arlington, Massachusetts), NRHP-listed
 Old Attleboro Post Office, Attleboro, NRHP-listed
 Santuit Post Office, Barnstable, NRHP-listed
 United States Post Office (Beverly, Massachusetts)
 United States Post Office, Courthouse, and Federal Building, listed on the NRHP in Boston
 Old Post Office Building (Brockton, Massachusetts)
 U.S. Post Office-Central Square, Cambridge
 Old Post Office Building (Deerfield, Massachusetts), NRHP-listed
 United States Post Office-Easthampton Main
 United States Post Office-Great Barrington Main
 United States Post Office-Greenfield Main
 United States Post Office-Holyoke Main
 United States Post Office-Lexington Main
 Lowell Post Office, in Lowell
 Thomas P. Costin Jr. Post Office Building, in Lynn, NRHP-listed
 Old Post Office Building (Lynn, Massachusetts), NRHP-listed
 United States Post Office-Medford Main
 United States Post Office-Middleborough Main
 United States Post Office-Millbury Main
 United States Post Office-Milton Main
 United States Post Office-Newburyport Main
 United States Post Office-Whitinsville Main
 United States Post Office-Palmer Main
 Plymouth Post Office Building, Plymouth
 United States Post Office (Provincetown, Massachusetts)
 United States Post Office-Quincy Main
 United States Post Office-Salem Main
 United States Post Office-Somerville Main
 United States Post Office Garage, South Boston
 United States Post Office-South Hadley Main
 United States Post Office-Taunton Main
 United States Post Office-Wakefield Main
 United States Post Office-Waltham Main
 United States Post Office-Weymouth Landing, Weymouth
 United States Post Office-Williamstown Main
 United States Post Office-Winchester Main
 United States Post Office-Woburn Center Station, Woburn
 United States Post Office (Worcester, Massachusetts), listed on the NRHP

Michigan 
 Main Street Post Office, in Ann Arbor, MI, NRHP-listed
 Battle Creek Post Office, in Battle Creek, MI, NRHP-listed
 Climax Post Office Building, in Climax, MI, NRHP-listed
 Stone Post Office, Jackson, MI, NRHP-listed
 U.S. Post Office (Grand Rapids, Michigan), NRHP-listed in Kent County
 Lincoln Park Post Office, in Lincoln Park, MI, NRHP-listed
 Old U.S. Post Office (Niles, Michigan), NRHP-listed
 Castle Museum (Saginaw, Michigan), also known as Saginaw Post Office or Castle Station, NRHP-listed
 United States Post Office (Flint, Michigan)

Minnesota 

 U.S. Post Office-Alexandria, in Alexandria, Minnesota, listed on the NRHP in Minnesota
 Anoka Post Office, in Anoka, Minnesota, listed on the NRHP in Minnesota
 United States Post Office (Fairmont, Minnesota), listed on the NRHP in Martin County, Minnesota
 Federal Courthouse and Post Office (Mankato, Minnesota), listed on the NRHP in Minnesota
 United States Post Office (Minneapolis, Minnesota), listed on the NRHP in Hennepin County, Minnesota
 Federal Courthouse and Post Office (Moorhead, Minnesota), listed on the NRHP in Minnesota
 New Ulm Post Office, in New Ulm, Minnesota, listed on the NRHP in Minnesota
 Landmark Center (St. Paul), Saint Paul, Minnesota, originally served as the United States Post Office, Court House, and Custom House
 United States Post Office and Custom House (St. Paul, Minnesota), listed on the NRHP in Ramsey County, Minnesota
 Lost Lake Post Office, in Plymouth, Minnesota

Mississippi
 U.S. Courthouse and Post Office (Aberdeen, Mississippi), NRHP-listed
 United States Post Office-Amory, in Amory, Mississippi, listed on the NRHP in Mississippi
 U.S. Post Office, Courthouse, and Customhouse (Biloxi, Mississippi), NRHP-listed, in Harrison County
 United States Post Office (Brookhaven, Mississippi), listed on the NRHP in Mississippi
 U.S. Post Office (Carthage, Mississippi), listed on the NRHP in Mississippi
 U.S. Post Office (Cleveland, Mississippi), listed on the NRHP in Mississippi
 U.S. Post Office (Columbia, Mississippi), listed on the NRHP in Mississippi
 Old U.S. Post Office (Corinth, Mississippi), listed on the NRHP in Mississippi
 United States Post Office-Crystal Springs, in Crystal Springs, Mississippi, listed on the NRHP in Mississippi
 United States Post Office-Forest, in Forest, Mississippi, listed on the NRHP in Mississippi
 Old U.S. Post Office (Greenwood, Mississippi), a Mississippi Landmark
 Old U.S. Post Office (Grenada, Mississippi), listed on the NRHP in Mississippi and as a Mississippi Landmark
 U.S. Post Office and Customhouse (Gulfport, Mississippi), Gulfport, Mississippi, NRHP-listed
 U.S. Post Office (Hattiesburg, Mississippi), listed on the NRHP in Forrest County, Mississippi
 United States Post Office-Hazlehurst, in Hazlehurst, Mississippi, listed on the NRHP in Mississippi
 Old U.S. Post Office (Kosciusko, Mississippi), a Mississippi Landmark
 U.S. Post Office (Leland, Mississippi), listed on the NRHP in Mississippi
 U.S. Post Office (Lumberton, Mississippi), listed on the NRHP in Mississippi
 United States Post Office-Magnolia, in Magnolia, Mississippi, listed on the NRHP in Mississippi
 Old U.S. Post Office (McComb, Mississippi), a Mississippi Landmark
 United States Post Office and Courthouse (Meridian, Mississippi), NRHP-listed
 Old U.S. Post Office (Natchez, Mississippi), a Mississippi Landmark
 Old US Post Office (Philadelphia, Mississippi), listed on the NRHP in Mississippi
 United States Post Office, Old--Ripley, in Ripley, Mississippi, listed on the NRHP in Mississippi
 United States Post Office-Water Valley, in Water Valley, Mississippi, listed on the NRHP in Mississippi
 Old U.S. Post Office (West Point, Mississippi), a Mississippi Landmark
 U.S. Post Office (Winona, Mississippi), listed on the NRHP in Mississippi

Missouri
Bank of Avilla, aka US Post Office, Avilla, Missouri, NRHP-listed
 U.S. Post Office (Carrollton, Missouri), NRHP-listed
 United States Post Office-Kansas City, in Kansas City, MO, NRHP-listed in Jackson County: Downtown Kansas City
 U.S. Courthouse and Post Office-Kansas City, MO, in Kansas City, MO, NRHP-listed and a U.S. National Historic Landmark
 Union Station Post Office Annex, in St. Louis, MO, NRHP-listed in downtown St. Louis
 United States Customhouse and Post Office (St. Louis, Missouri), a National Historic Landmark building in St. Louis, Missouri
 U.S. Customhouse and Post Office (Springfield, Missouri), NRHP-listed
Lee's Summit Post Office, Lee's Summit, Missouri, NRHP-listed in Jackson County

Montana
 U.S. Post Office-Anaconda Main, in Anaconda, Montana, listed on the NRHP in Montana
 U.S. Post Office and Courthouse–Billings
 U.S. Post Office (Butte, Montana)
 U.S. Post Office-Dillon Main, in Dillon, Montana, listed on the NRHP in Montana
 U.S. Post Office and Courthouse–Glasgow Main, Glasgow, Montana
 U.S. Post Office (Glendive, Montana), NRHP-listed in Dawson County
 U.S. Post Office and Courthouse–Great Falls
 U.S. Post Office and Courthouse–Havre Main, in Havre, Montana
 U.S. Post Office and Federal Building-Lewistown, in Lewistown, Montana, listed on the NRHP in Montana
 U.S. Post Office-Livingston Main, in Livingston, Montana, listed on the NRHP in Montana
 Miles City Main Post Office, in Miles City, Montana, NRHP-listed
 U.S. Post Office (Missoula, Montana)

Nebraska
 United States Post Office (Albion, Nebraska), in Albion, Nebraska, NRHP-listed in Boone County
 United States Post Office-Auburn, in Auburn, Nebraska, NRHP-listed in Nemaha County
 United States Post Office (Crawford, Nebraska), in Crawford, Nebraska, NRHP-listed in Dawes County
 Old Fremont Post Office, in Fremont, Nebraska, NRHP-listed in Dodge County
 United States Post Office-Geneva, Nebraska, in Geneva, Nebraska, NRHP-listed in Fillmore County
 Grand Island United States Post Office and Courthouse
 United States Post Office-Hebron, in Hebron, Nebraska, NRHP-listed
 U.S. Post Office (Kearney, Nebraska), now the Museum of Nebraska Art, NRHP-listed in Buffalo County
 Minden United States Post Office, in Minden, Nebraska, NRHP-listed in Buffalo County
 U.S. Post Office (Nebraska City, Nebraska), NRHP-listed in Otoe County
 U.S. Post Office and Courthouse (Norfolk, Nebraska)
 United States Post Office (O'Neill, Nebraska), NRHP-listed in Holt County
 United States Post Office-Ogallala, in Ogallala, Nebraska, NRHP-listed in Keith County
 Old Post Office (Omaha, Nebraska), demolished building
 United States Post Office-Pawnee City, in Pawnee City, Nebraska, NRHP-listed in Pawnee City
 Red Cloud United States Post Office, in Red Cloud, Nebraska, NRHP-listed
 United States Post Office-Schuyler, in Schuyler, Nebraska, NRHP-listed in Colfax County
 United States Post Office-Scottsbluff, in Scottsbluff, Nebraska, NRHP-listed
 U.S. Post Office-Valentine, in Valentine, Nebraska, NRHP-listed in Cherry County
 Wayne United States Post Office, in Wayne, Nebraska, NRHP-listed

Nevada 
 Carson City Post Office, in Carson City, NV, NRHP-listed
 Elko Main Post Office, in Elko, NV, NRHP-listed
 U.S. Post Office (Ely, Nevada), NRHP-listed
 Federal Building and Post Office (Fallon, Nevada), NRHP-listed
 Las Vegas Post Office and Courthouse, NRHP-listed
 U.S. Post Office-Lovelock Main, in Lovelock, NV, NRHP-listed
 Reno Main Post Office, in Reno, NV, NRHP-listed
 Tonopah Main Post Office, in Tonopah, NV, NRHP-listed
 Winnemucca Main Post Office, in Winnemucca, NV, NRHP-listed
 U.S. Post Office (Yerington, Nevada), NRHP-listed

New Hampshire 
 Old Post Office (Concord, New Hampshire), NRHP-listed
 United States Post Office-Dover Main, in Dover, NRHP-listed
 United States Post Office-Laconia Main, in Laconia, NRHP-listed
 United States Post Office–Lancaster Main, in Lancaster, NRHP-listed
 United States Post Office and Courthouse–Littleton Main, in Littleton, NRHP-listed
 Old Post Office Block, in Manchester, NRHP-listed
 United States Post Office-Peterborough Main, in Peterborough, NRHP-listed
 United States Post Office-Somersworth Main, in Somersworth, NRHP-listed

New Jersey 
 Belcoville Post Office, in Belcoville, New Jersey, listed on the NRHP in Atlantic County
 United States Post Office and Courthouse (Camden, New Jersey),  listed on the NRHP in Camden County
 Main Post Office, in New Brunswick, New Jersey, listed on the NRHP in Middlesex County
 Post Office Building, Upper Montclair, in Montclair, New Jersey, listed on the NRHP in Essex County
 United States Post Office (Metuchen, New Jersey), listed on the NRHP in Middlesex County
U.S. Post Office and Courthouse (Trenton, New Jersey), listed on the NRHP in Mercer County

New Mexico
 United States Post Office-Alamogordo, in Alamogordo, NM, listed on the NRHP in New Mexico
 Old Post Office (Albuquerque, New Mexico), listed on the NRHP in Albuquerque
 Old Clovis Post Office in Clovis, NM, listed on the NRHP in New Mexico
 United States Post Office-Deming Main, in Deming, NM, listed on the NRHP in New Mexico
 United States Post Office (Gallup, New Mexico), listed on the NRHP in New Mexico
 Old Las Vegas Post Office in Las Vegas, NM, listed on the NRHP in New Mexico
 United States Post Office-Portales Main, in Portales, NM, listed on the NRHP in New Mexico
 United States Post Office-Truth or Consequences Main, in Truth or Consequences, NM, listed on the NRHP in New Mexico
 Irvington, New Jersey in Irvington, NJ.

New York

 United States Post Office (Akron, New York)
 Old Post Office (Albany, New York)
 United States Post Office (Albion, New York)
 United States Post Office (Amsterdam, New York)
 United States Post Office (Angola, New York)
 United States Post Office (Attica, New York)
 Old Post Office and Courthouse (Auburn, New York)
 United States Post Office (Batavia, New York), contributing structure in the Genesee County Courthouse Historic District
 United States Post Office (Ballston Spa, New York)
 United States Post Office (Bath, New York)
 United States Post Office (Bay Shore, New York)
 United States Post Office (Beacon, New York)
 United States Post Office (Boonville, New York)
 United States Post Office (Brewerton, New York)
 United States Post Office (Bronxville, New York)
 United States Post Office (Buffalo, New York), now known as Old Post Office (Buffalo, New York)
 United States Post Office (Canajoharie, New York)
 United States Post Office (Canandaigua, New York)
 United States Post Office (Canastota, New York)
 United States Post Office (Canton, New York)
 United States Post Office (Carthage, New York)
 United States Post Office (Catskill, New York)
 United States Post Office (Cicero, New York)
 United States Post Office (Cleveland, New York)
 United States Post Office (Clyde, New York)
 United States Post Office (Constantia, New York)
 United States Post Office (Cooperstown, New York)
 United States Post Office (Corning, New York)
 United States Post Office (Cortland, New York)
 United States Post Office (Dansville, New York)
 United States Post Office (Delhi, New York)
 United States Post Office (Delmar, New York)
 United States Post Office (Depew, New York)
 United States Post Office (Dobbs Ferry, New York)
 United States Post Office (Dolgeville, New York)
 United States Post Office (Dunkirk, New York)
 United States Post Office (East Rochester, New York)
 United States Post Office (Ellenville, New York)
 United States Post Office (Elizabethtown, New York)
 Old Platte Clove Post Office, in Elka Park, NY
 United States Post Office (Endicott, New York)
 United States Post Office (Fort Plain, New York)
 United States Post Office (Frankfort, New York)
 United States Post Office (Fredonia, New York)
 United States Post Office (Freeport, New York)
 United States Post Office (Fulton, New York)
 United States Post Office (Gabriels, New York)
 United States Post Office (Garden City, New York)
 United States Post Office (Geneva, New York)
 Old Glen Cove Post Office, a former post office in Glen Cove, New York on the NRHP in the Town of Oyster Bay, New York
 United States Post Office (Glen Cove, New York)
 United States Post Office (Goshen, New York)
 United States Post Office (Gouverneur, New York)
 United States Post Office (Granville, New York)
 United States Post Office (Great Neck, New York)
 United States Post Office (Greece, New York)
 United States Village Post Office (Greece, New York)
 United States Post Office (Hamilton, New York)
 United States Post Office (Harrison, New York)
 United States Post Office (Haverstraw, New York)
 United States Post Office (Hempstead, New York)
 United States Post Office (Herkimer, New York)
 United States Post Office (Homer, New York)
 United States Post Office (Honeoye Falls, New York)
 United States Post Office (Hoosick Falls, New York)
 United States Post Office (Hornell, New York)
 United States Post Office (Hudson, New York)
 United States Post Office (Hudson Falls, New York)
 United States Post Office (Hyde Park, New York)
 United States Post Office (Ilion, New York)
 United States Post Office (Ithaca, New York)
 United States Post Office (Johnson City, New York)
 United States Post Office (Johnstown, New York)
 United States Post Office (Kirkville, New York)
 United States Post Office (Lake George, New York)
 United States Post Office (Lake Placid, New York)
 United States Post Office (Lancaster, New York)
 United States Post Office (Larchmont, New York)
 United States Post Office (Le Roy, New York)
 United States Post Office (Little Falls, New York)
 United States Post Office (Little Valley, New York)
 United States Post Office (Lockport, New York)
 United States Post Office (Long Beach, New York)
 United States Post Office (Lyons, New York)
 United States Post Office (Malone, New York)
 United States Post Office (Medina, New York)
 United States Post Office (Middleburgh, New York)
 United States Post Office (Middleport, New York)
 United States Post Office (Mineola, New York)
 United States Post Office (Mount Vernon, New York)
 United States Post Office (New Rochelle, New York)
New York City

 James A. Farley Post Office Building, main New York, NY (Manhattan) post office
 90 Church Street, in lower Manhattan
 United States Post Office (Canal Street Station), New York, NY
 United States Post Office (Cooper Station), New York, NY
 United States Post Office (Inwood Station), New York, NY
 United States Post Office (Knickerbocker Station), New York, NY
 United States Post Office (Lenox Hill Station), New York, NY
 United States Post Office (Madison Square Station), New York, NY
 United States Post Office (Old Chelsea Station), New York, NY

 Federal Building and Post Office (Brooklyn), main Brooklyn, NY post office
 United States Post Office (Bensonhurst, Brooklyn), Parkville Station
 United States Post Office (Flatbush, Brooklyn)
 United States Post Office (Kensington, Brooklyn)
 United States Post Office (Williamsburg, Brooklyn), Metropolitan Station

 United States Post Office–Bronx Central Annex
 United States Post Office (Morrisania, Bronx)

 United States Post Office (Far Rockaway, Queens)
 United States Post Office (Flushing, Queens)
 United States Post Office (Forest Hills, Queens)
 United States Post Office (Jackson Heights, Queens)
 United States Post Office (Jamaica, Queens)
 United States Post Office (Long Island City, Queens)
 United States Post Office (Newark, New York)
 United States Post Office (Newburgh, New York)
 United States Post Office (Newtonville, New York)
 United States Post Office (Niagara Falls, New York)
 United States Post Office (North Tonawanda, New York)
 United States Post Office (Northport, New York)
 United States Post Office (Norwich, New York)
 United States Post Office (Nyack, New York)
 United States Post Office (Ogdensburg, New York)
 United States Post Office (Olean, New York)
 United States Post Office (Oneida, New York)
 Old Post Office (Oneonta, New York)
 United States Post Office (Owego, New York)
 United States Post Office (Oxford, New York)
 United States Post Office (Oyster Bay, New York)
 United States Post Office (Painted Post, New York)
 United States Post Office (Patchogue, New York)
 United States Post Office (Paul Smiths, New York)
 United States Post Office (Pearl River, New York)
 United States Post Office (Peekskill, New York)
 United States Post Office (Penn Yan, New York)
 United States Post Office (Port Chester, New York)
 United States Post Office (Port Jervis, New York)
 United States Post Office (Potsdam, New York)
 United States Post Office (Poughkeepsie, New York)
 United States Post Office (Rainbow Lake, New York)
 United States Post Office (Rhinebeck, New York)
 O'Brien General Store and Post Office, Rhinecliff, NY
 United States Post Office (Richfield Springs, New York)
 United States Post Office (Riverhead, New York)
 United States Post Office (Rockville Centre, New York)
 United States Post Office (Rye, New York)
 United States Post Office (Saranac Lake, New York)
 United States Post Office (Saratoga Springs, New York)
 United States Post Office (Scarsdale, New York)
 United States Post Office (Schenectady, New York)
 United States Post Office (Scotia, New York)
 United States Post Office (Seneca Falls, New York)
 United States Post Office (Spring Valley, New York)
 United States Post Office (Springville, New York)
 United States Post Office (St. Johnsville, New York)
 United States Post Office (Suffern, New York)
 United States Post Office (Ticonderoga, New York)
 United States Post Office (Tupper Lake, New York)
 United States Post Office (Tonawanda, New York)
 United States Post Office (Troy, New York)
 United States Post Office (Walton, New York)
 Wappingers Falls Village Hall, formerly "US Post Office of Wappingers Falls"
 United States Post Office (Warsaw, New York)
 United States Post Office (Waterloo, New York)
 United States Post Office (Watkins Glen, New York)
 United States Post Office (Waverly, New York)
 United States Post Office (Wellsville, New York)
 United States Post Office (Westhampton Beach, New York)
 United States Post Office (Whitehall, New York)
 United States Post Office (Yonkers, New York)

North Carolina
 Former US Post Office (Belmont, North Carolina), listed on the NRHP in North Carolina
 United States Post Office (Boone, North Carolina), listed on the NRHP in North Carolina
 United States Post Office (Burlington, North Carolina), listed on the NRHP in Burlington
 United States Post Office (Fayetteville, North Carolina), listed on the NRHP in North Carolina
 United States Post Office (Greenville, North Carolina), listed on the NRHP in North Carolina
 United States Post Office (Lumberton, North Carolina), listed on the NRHP in North Carolina
 Cana Store and Post Office, in Mocksville, North Carolina, listed on the NRHP in North Carolina
 United States Post Office (Monroe, North Carolina), listed on the NRHP in North Carolina
 Former US Post Office (Mount Olive, North Carolina), listed on the NRHP in North Carolina
United States Post Office and Courthouse (New Bern, North Carolina, 1935), a contributing property
 U. S. Post Office and Federal Building (Rockingham, North Carolina), in Rockingham, NC, listed on the NRHP in North Carolina
 Salvo Post Office, Salvo, North Carolina, listed on the NRHP in North Carolina
 Former US Post Office (Smithfield, North Carolina), listed on the NRHP in North Carolina
 U.S. Post Office and County Courthouse, in Statesville, North Carolina, listed on the NRHP in North Carolina
 United States Post Office (Wadesboro, North Carolina), listed on the NRHP in North Carolina
 Former US Post Office Building (Waynesville, North Carolina), listed on the NRHP in North Carolina

North Dakota 

 U.S. Post Office and Courthouse (Bismarck, North Dakota), NRHP-listed
 United States Post Office-Carrington, in Carrington, NRHP-listed
 Post Office (Christine, North Dakota), in Christine, NRHP-listed
 United States Post Office and Courthouse (Devils Lake, North Dakota), NRHP-listed
 United States Post Office-Dickinson, in Dickinson, NRHP-listed
 United States Post Office-Grafton, in Grafton, NRHP-listed
 Ronald N. Davies Federal Building and United States Courthouse, listed on the NRHP in Grand Forks as "U.S. Post Office and Courthouse"
 Grassy Butte Post Office, in Grassy Butte, NRHP-listed
 United States Post Office-Hettinger, in Hettinger, NRHP-listed
 United States Post Office-Langdon, in Langdon, NRHP-listed
 United States Post Office-Lisbon, in Lisbon, NRHP-listed
 U.S. Post Office (Minot, North Dakota), NRHP-listed
 United States Post Office-Oakes, in Oakes, NRHP-listed
 United States Customs House and Post Office-Pembina, in Pembina, NRHP-listed
 United States Post Office-New Rockford, in New Rockford, NRHP-listed
 United States Post Office-Rugby, in Rugby, NRHP-listed
 United States Post Office-Valley City, in Valley City, NRHP-listed
 United States Post Office-Wahpeton, in Wahpeton, NRHP-listed
Old U.S. Post Office (Williston, North Dakota), NRHP-listed

Ohio
 Akron Post Office and Federal Building, listed on the NRHP in Akron
 Old Akron Post Office, listed on the NRHP in Akron, Ohio
 U.S. Post Office (Bowling Green, Ohio), listed on the NRHP in Ohio
 Chardon Post Office Building, in Chardon, OH, listed on the NRHP in Ohio
 U.S. Post Office (Chesterville, Ohio), listed on the NRHP in Ohio
 Old College Hill Post Office, listed on the NRHP in Cincinnati
 Howard M. Metzenbaum United States Courthouse, listed on the NRHP in Cleveland as "Old Federal Building and Post Office"
 Franklinton Post Office, in Columbus, OH, listed on the NRHP in Ohio
 U.S. Post Office and Courthouse (Columbus, Ohio), listed on the NRHP in Ohio
 Old Post Office and Federal Building (Dayton, Ohio), in Dayton, OH, listed on the NRHP in Ohio
 East Liverpool Post Office, in East Liverpool, OH, listed on the NRHP in Ohio
 U.S. Post Office (Elyria, Ohio), listed on the NRHP in Ohio
 Old Log Post Office, listed on the NRHP in Franklin
 U.S. Post Office (Lima, Ohio), listed on the NRHP in Lima
 U.S. Post Office (Lorain, Ohio), listed on the NRHP in Ohio
Old U.S. Post Office (Marion, Ohio), NRHP-listed
 U.S. Post Office (Sandusky, Ohio), listed on the NRHP in Ohio
 Old Central Post Office in Toledo, OH, listed on the NRHP in Ohio
 Mill Office and Post Office, listed on the NRHP in Woodsdale, Ohio
 United States Post Office and Federal Building (Zanesville, Ohio), listed on the NRHP in Zanesville

Oklahoma 
 Kingfisher Post Office, in Kingfisher, OK, NRHP-listed
 United States Post Office Madill, in Madill, OK, NRHP-listed
 United States Post Office and Courthouse (Muskogee, Oklahoma), NRHP-listed
 United States Post Office (Norman, Oklahoma), NRHP-listed
 United States Post Office Nowata, in Nowata, OK, NRHP-listed
 United States Post Office, Courthouse, and Federal Office Building (Oklahoma City, Oklahoma), NRHP-listed
 United States Post Office and Courthouse (Tulsa, Oklahoma), NRHP-listed
 Woodward Federal Courthouse and Post Office, in Woodward, OK, NRHP-listed

Oregon 
 U.S. Post Office (Astoria, Oregon), listed on the NRHP
 Old U.S. Post Office (Bend, Oregon), listed on the NRHP
 U.S. Post Office (Eugene, Oregon), listed on the National Register of Historic Places in Lane County
 United States Post Office (The Dalles, Oregon, 1916), listed on the NRHP
 U.S. Post Office and Federal Building (La Grande, Oregon), listed on the NRHP
 U.S. Post Office and Courthouse (Medford, Oregon), listed on the NRHP
 United States Post Office and Courthouse (Pendleton, Oregon), listed on the NRHP
 511 Federal Building, a former post office, listed on the NRHP
 St. Johns Post Office (Portland, Oregon), listed on the NRHP
 U.S. Post Office (Roseburg, Oregon), listed on the NRHP
 United States Post Office (Scappoose, Oregon), listed on the NRHP
 U.S. Post Office (Tillamook, Oregon), listed on the National Register of Historic Places in Tillamook County

Pennsylvania 

 United States Post Office (Charleroi, Pennsylvania), listed on the NRHP in Washington County
 United States Post Office (Connellsville, Pennsylvania), listed on the NRHP in Fayette County
 Erie Federal Courthouse and Post Office, in Erie, listed on the NRHP in Erie County
 United States Post Office (Hanover, Pennsylvania), listed on the NRHP in York County
 United States Post Office (Lancaster, Pennsylvania), listed on the NRHP in Lancaster County
 United States Post Office (Oil City, Pennsylvania), listed on the NRHP in Venango County
 United States Post Office-Main Branch (Philadelphia, Pennsylvania), listed on the NRHP in Philadelphia County
 United States Court House and Post Office Building (currently known as the Robert N. C. Nix Sr. Federal Building), in Philadelphia, listed on the NRHP in Philadelphia County
 Allegheny Post Office, Pittsburgh, listed on the NRHP in Allegheny County and now part of the Children's Museum of Pittsburgh
 United States Post Office and Courthouse (Pittsburgh, Pennsylvania), listed on the NRHP in Allegheny County
 United States Post Office (Punxsutawney, Pennsylvania), listed on the NRHP in Jefferson County
 United States Post Office-Sewickley Branch, Sewickley, listed on the NRHP in Allegheny County
 United States Post Office (Williamsport, Pennsylvania), listed on the NRHP in Lycoming County

Puerto Rico 
 Luis A. Ferré United States Courthouse and Post Office Building, Ponce, Puerto Rico, NRPH-listed as "United States Courthouse and Post Office Building"
 Miguel Angel García Méndez Post Office Building, Mayaguez, Puerto Rico, NRHP-listed as "U.S. Post Office and Courthouse"
 Jose V. Toledo Federal Building and United States Courthouse, San Juan, Puerto Rico, NRHP-listed as "U.S. Post Office and Courthouse"

Rhode Island 
 Bristol Customshouse and Post Office, Bristol, Rhode Island
 Pawtucket Post Office, Pawtucket, Rhode Island
 United States Post Office (Westerly, Rhode Island)
 United States Post Office (Woonsocket, Rhode Island)

South Carolina 
 Bamberg Post Office, in Bamberg, SC, listed on the NRHP
 United States Post Office and Courthouse (Charleston, South Carolina), listed on the NRHP
 United States Post Office (Florence, South Carolina), listed on the NRHP
 Old Greenville City Hall, Greenville, South Carolina, also known as United States Post Office and Courthouse
 Hartsville Post Office, in Hartsville, SC, listed on the NRHP
 Monticello Store and Post Office, in Monticello, SC, listed on the NRHP
 Price's Post Office, in Moore, listed on the NRHP
 United States Post Office and Courthouse (Rock Hill, South Carolina), listed on the NRHP

South Dakota
 United States Post Office and Courthouse–Aberdeen, in Aberdeen, South Dakota
 Leola Post Office, in Leola, South Dakota, listed on the NRHP in South Dakota
 Old Spearfish Post Office, Spearfish, South Dakota, NRHP-listed in Lawrence County
 Marindahl Post Office, in Volin, South Dakota, NRHP-listed in Yankton County
 Watertown Post Office, in Watertown, South Dakota, listed on the NRHP in South Dakota
 Lemmon post office, in Lemmon, South Dakota

Tennessee
 United States Post Office-Shelby Street Station, in Bristol, TN, listed on the NRHP in Tennessee
 United States Post Office (Camden, Tennessee), listed on the NRHP in Tennessee
 Joel W. Solomon Federal Building and United States Courthouse, Chattanooga, Tennessee, listed on the NRHP as U.S. Post Office
 Old Post Office (Chattanooga, Tennessee), listed on the NRHP in Tennessee
 Customs House Museum and Cultural Center, a former customs house and former post office in Clarksville
 United States Post Office (Cleveland, Tennessee), listed on the NRHP in Tennessee
 Dickson Post Office, in Dickson, TN, listed on the NRHP in Tennessee
 United States Post Office (Elizabethton, Tennessee), listed on the NRHP in Tennessee
 United States Post Office and Mine Rescue Station, in Jellico, TN, listed on the NRHP in Tennessee
 Knoxville Post Office
 Old Post Office Building (Knoxville, Tennessee)
 United States Post Office (Martin, Tennessee), listed on the NRHP in Tennessee
 United States Post Office-Main, in McMinnville, TN, listed on the NRHP in Tennessee
 United States Post Office-Front Street Station, in Memphis, TN, listed on the NRHP in Tennessee
 United States Post Office (Milan, Tennessee), listed on the NRHP in Tennessee
 United States Post Office (Morristown, Tennessee), listed on the NRHP in Tennessee
 United States Post Office (Nashville, Tennessee)
 United States Post Office-Old Hickory, in Old Hickory, TN, listed on the NRHP in Tennessee
 United States Post Office (Ripley, Tennessee), listed on the NRHP in Tennessee
 United States Post Office-Sevierville, in Sevierville, TN, listed on the NRHP in Tennessee
 United States Post Office (Trenton, Tennessee), listed on the NRHP in Tennessee
 United States Post Office (Union City, Tennessee), listed on the NRHP in Tennessee

Texas

 J .Marvin Jones Federal Building and United States Courthouse, Amarillo, Texas
 Arlington Post Office, in Arlington, TX, listed on the NRHP in Texas
 O. Henry Hall, listed on the NRHP in Austin as U.S. Post Office and Federal Building
 Beeville Post Office, in Beeville, TX, listed on the NRHP in Texas
 United States Post Office-Federal Building-Brenham, in Brenham, TX, listed on the NRHP in Texas
 Copperas Cove Stagestop and Post Office, in Copperas Cove, TX, listed on the NRHP in Texas
 U.S. Post Office (El Paso, Texas), listed on the NRHP in Texas
 United States Post Office (Fort Worth, Texas), listed on the NRHP in Texas
 Galveston U.S. Post Office and Courthouse, listed on the NRHP in Galveston
 Graham Post Office, in Graham, TX, listed on the NRHP in Texas
 Post Office Building (Greenville, Texas), listed on the NRHP in Greenville
 U.S. Post Office (Hillsboro, Texas), listed on the NRHP in Texas
 Jacksonville Post Office, in Jacksonville, TX, listed on the NRHP in Texas
 Old U.S. Post Office and Courts Building (Jefferson, Texas), NRHP-listed
 Laredo United States Post Office, Court House and Custom House, listed on the NRHP in Laredo
 Lubbock Post Office and Federal Building, in Lubbock, TX, listed on the NRHP in Texas
 Marshall U.S. Post Office, in Marshall, Texas, listed on the NRHP in Harrison County, Texas
 Post Office Building, Old (Nacogdoches, Texas), in Nacogdoches, TX, listed on the NRHP in Texas
 Post Office-Palestine, in Palestine, TX, listed on the NRHP in Texas
 United States Post Office-Pampa Main, in Pampa, TX, listed on the NRHP in Texas
 United States Post Office and Federal Building (Port Arthur, Texas), in Port Arthur, TX, listed on the NRHP in Texas
 de la Pena, Silverio, Drugstore and Post Office, in Rio Grande City, TX, listed on the NRHP in Texas
 Hipolito F. Garcia Federal Building and United States Courthouse, listed on the NRHP in San Antonio as "US Post Office and Courthouse"
 Sherman US Post Office and Courthouse, Sherman, TX, listed on the NRHP in Texas
 United States Post Office (Stamford, Texas), listed on the NRHP in Texas
 Tyler US Post Office and Courthouse, Tyler, TX, listed on the NRHP in Texas
 Old Federal Building and Post Office (Victoria, Texas), listed on the NRHP in Texas

Utah

 U.S. Post Office–Beaver Main, Beaver, Utah, NRHP-listed in Beaver County
 U.S. Post Office-Cedar City Main, in Cedar City, Utah, NRHP-listed in Iron County
 Echo Post Office, in Echo, Utah, NRHP-listed in Summit County
 U.S. Post Office-Eureka Main, in Eureka, Utah, NRHP-listed in Juab County, Utah
 U.S. Post Office-Helper Main, in Helper, Utah, NRHP-listed in Carbon County
 U.S. Post Office-Nephi Main, in Nephi, Utah, NRHP-listed in Juab County, Utah
 U.S. Post Office and Courthouse (Ogden, Utah)
 U.S. Post Office-Price Main, in Price, Utah, NRHP-listed in Carbon County,
 U.S. Post Office-Richfield Main, in Richfield, Utah, NRHP-listed in Sevier County
 Deseret Telegraph and Post Office, in Rockville, Utah, NRHP-listed in Washington County
 U.S. Post Office-Sugar House, in Salt Lake City, Utah, NRHP-listed Salt Lake City
 U.S. Post Office-Springville Main, in Springville, Utah, NRHP-listed in Utah County

Vermont 
 Bennington Post Office, Bennington, Vermont
 United States Post Office and Customhouse (Burlington, Vermont)
 Grafton Post Office, Grafton, Vermont
 United States Courthouse, Post Office and Customs House (Newport, Vermont)

Virginia 
 United States Post Office-Arlington, in Arlington, Virginia, listed on the NRHP in Virginia
 United States Post Office and Courthouse (Big Stone Gap, Virginia)
 Brooklyn Store and Post Office, in Brooklyn, Virginia, listed on the NRHP in Virginia
 United States Post Office-Christiansburg, in Christiansburg, Virginia, listed on the NRHP in Virginia
 Edom Store and Post Office, in Edom, Virginia, listed on the NRHP in Virginia
 Little Post Office, in Martinsville, Virginia, listed on the NRHP in Virginia
 Walter E. Hoffman United States Courthouse, listed on the NRHP as U.S. Post Office and Courthouse
 Lewis F. Powell Jr., United States Courthouse, listed on the NRHP as U.S. Post Office and Customhouse
 Salem Post Office, Salem, Virginia, NRHP-listed

Washington
 Auburn Post Office, in Auburn, WA, listed on the NRHP in Washington
 United States Post Office and Courthouse (Bellingham, Washington)
 United States Post Office-Bremerton Main, in Bremerton, WA, listed on the NRHP in Washington
 United States Post Office-Camas Main, in Camas, WA, listed on the NRHP in Washington
 United States Post Office-Centralia Main, in Centralia, WA, listed on the NRHP in Washington
 United States Post Office-Chehalis Main, in Chehalis, WA, listed on the NRHP in Washington
 Chimacum Post Office, in Chimacum, WA, listed on the NRHP in Washington
 United States Post Office-Clarkston Main, in Clarkston, WA, listed on the NRHP in Washington
 United States Post Office-Colfax Main, in Colfax, WA, listed on the NRHP in Washington
 United States Post Office-Colville Main, in Colville, WA, listed on the NRHP in Washington
 Doe Bay General Store and Post Office, in Doe Bay, Orcas Island, WA, listed on the NRHP in Washington
 United States Post Office and Customshouse, in Everett, Washington, listed on the NRHP in Washington
 United States Post Office-Hoquiam Main, in Hoquiam, WA, listed on the NRHP in Washington
 United States Post Office-Kelso Main, in Kelso, WA, listed on the NRHP in Washington
 United States Post Office-Longview Main, in Longview, WA, listed on the NRHP in Washington
 United States Post Office-Lyden Main, in Lyden, WA, listed on the NRHP in Washington
 United States Post Office-Montesano Main, in Montesano, WA, listed on the NRHP in Washington
 United States Post Office-Okanogan Main, in Okanogan, WA, listed on the NRHP in Washington
 United States Post Office (Olympia, Washington), listed on the NRHP in Washington
 United States Post Office-Omak Main, in Omak, WA, listed on the NRHP in Washington
 United States Post Office (Port Angeles, Washington), listed on the NRHP in Washington
 United States Post Office-Port Townsend Main
 United States Post Office-Prosser Main, in Prosser, WA, listed on the NRHP in Washington
 United States Post Office-Pullman, in Pullman, WA, listed on the NRHP in Washington
 United States Post Office-Raymond Main, in Raymond, WA, listed on the NRHP in Washington
 United States Post Office-Queen Anne Post Office, in Seattle, WA, listed on the NRHP in Washington
 United States Post Office-Sedro Woolley Main, in Sedro Woolley, WA, listed on the NRHP in Washington
 United States Post Office, Courthouse, and Custom House (Spokane, Washington)
 United States Post Office-Sunnyside Main, in Sunnyside, WA, listed on the NRHP in Washington
 United States Post Office-Tacoma Downtown Station-Federal Building, in Tacoma, WA, listed on the NRHP in Washington
 United States Post Office-Toppenish Main, in Toppenish, WA, listed on the NRHP in Washington
 United States Post Office-Vancouver Main, in Vancouver, WA, listed on the NRHP in Washington
 United States Post Office-Walla Walla Main, in Walla Walla, WA, listed on the NRHP in Washington
 United States Post Office and Annex, in Wenatchee, WA, listed on the NRHP in Washington
 William O. Douglas Federal Building, listed on the NRHP as U.S. Post Office and Courthouse, Yakima, Washington

Washington, D. C. 
 Postal Square Building, current home to the National Postal Museum
 General Post Office (Washington, D.C.), NRHP-listed
 Customhouse and Post Office (Washington, D.C.), NRHP-listed
 Old Post Office Pavilion, listed on the NRHP as "Old Post Office and Clock Tower"

West Virginia 
 U.S. Post Office and Courthouse (Huntington, West Virginia), NRHP-listed, in Cabell County
 Old Morgantown Post Office, Morgantown, West Virginia, NRHP-listed, also known as Monongalia Arts Center
 St. Albans Post Office, St. Albans, West Virginia, NRHP-listed, in Kanawha County

Wisconsin
 Antigo Post Office, in Antigo, Wisconsin, listed on the NRHP in Langlade County
 Old Ashland Post Office, listed on the NRHP in Ashland County
 Berlin Post Office, in Berlin, Wisconsin, listed on the NRHP in Green Lake County
 Chilton Post Office, Chilton, Wisconsin, NRHP-listed, in Calumet County
 Clintonville Post Office, in Clintonville, Wisconsin, listed on the NRHP in Waupaca County
 Columbus Post Office, in Columbus, Wisconsin, listed on the NRHP in Columbia County
 Delavan Post Office, in Delavan, Wisconsin, listed on the NRHP in Walworth County
 Edgerton Post Office, in Edgerton, Wisconsin, listed on the NRHP in Rock County
 Elkhorn Post Office, in Elkhorn, Wisconsin, listed on the NRHP in Walworth County
 United States Post Office and Courthouse (Eau Claire, Wisconsin), NRHP-listed, in Eau Claire County
 Former United States Post Office (Kaukauna, Wisconsin), listed on the NRHP in Outagamie County
 Kewaunee Post Office, in Kewaunee, Wisconsin, listed on the NRHP in Kewaunee County
 Lancaster Post Office, in Lancaster, Wisconsin, listed on the NRHP in Grant County
 United States Post Office and Federal Courthouse, in Madison, Wisconsin, listed on the NRHP in Dane County
 Marshfield Post Office, in Marshfield, Wisconsin, listed on the NRHP in Wood County
 Medford Post Office, in Medford, Wisconsin, listed on the NRHP in Taylor County
 US Post Office-Menasha, in Menasha, Wisconsin, listed on the NRHP in Winnebago County
 Merrill Post Office, in Merrill, Wisconsin, listed on the NRHP in Lincoln County
 Neenah United States Post Office, in Neenah, Wisconsin, listed on the NRHP in Winnebago County
 Neillsville Post Office, in Neillsville, Wisconsin, listed on the NRHP in Clark County
 Oconto Main Post Office in Oconto, Wisconsin, listed on the NRHP in Oconto County
 Park Falls Post Office, in Park Falls, Wisconsin, listed on the NRHP in Price County
 Plymouth Post Office, in Plymouth, Wisconsin, listed on the NRHP in Sheboygan County
 Prairie du Chien Post Office, in Prairie du Chien, Wisconsin, listed on the NRHP in Crawford County
 Shawano Post Office, Shawano, Wisconsin, listed on the NRHP in Shawano County
 Sheboygan Post Office, Sheboygan, Wisconsin, listed on the NRHP in Wisconsin
 South Milwaukee Post Office, South Milwaukee, Wisconsin, listed on the NRHP in Milwaukee County
 Sturgeon Bay Post Office, listed on the NRHP in Door County
 Tomah Post Office, Tomah, Wisconsin, listed on the NRHP in Monroe County
 Two Rivers Post Office, Two Rivers, Wisconsin, listed on the NRHP in Manitowoc County
 Waukesha Post Office, in Waukesha, Wisconsin, listed on the NRHP in Waukesha County
 Waupaca Post Office, in Waupaca, Wisconsin, listed on the NRHP in Waupaca County
 Waupun Post Office, in Waupun, Wisconsin, listed on the NRHP in Fond du Lac County
 United States Post Office and Court House (Wausau, Wisconsin), listed on the NRHP in Marathon County
 West Allis Post Office, in West Allis, Wisconsin, listed on the NRHP in Milwaukee County
 West Bend Post Office, in West Bend, Wisconsin, listed on the NRHP in Washington County
 Whitewater Post Office, in Whitewater, Wisconsin, listed on the NRHP in Walworth County
 US Post Office-Racine Main, in Racine, Wisconsin, listed on the NRHP in Racine County

Wyoming 
 United States Post Office (Basin, Wyoming), NRHP-listed
 United States Post Office (Buffalo, Wyoming), NRHP-listed
 United States Post Office (Douglas, Wyoming), NRHP-listed
 Evanston Main Post Office, Evanston, Wyoming, NRHP-listed as U.S. Post Office-Evanston Main
 United States Post Office-Green River, NRHP-listed
 United States Post Office (Greybull, Wyoming), NRHP-listed
 Sussex Post Office and Store, Kaycee, Wyoming, NRHP-listed, in Johnson County
 United States Post Office (Kemmerer, Wyoming), NRHP-listed
 United States Post Office and Courthouse (Lander, Wyoming), NRHP-listed
 United States Post Office (Newcastle, Wyoming), NRHP-listed
 United States Post Office (Powell, Wyoming), NRHP-listed
 United States Post Office (Thermopolis, Wyoming), NRHP-listed
 United States Post Office (Torrington, Wyoming), NRHP-listed
 United States Post Office (Yellowstone National Park), Yellowstone, Wyoming, NRHP-listed

See also
 Federal Building and Post Office (disambiguation)
 Old Post Office (disambiguation)
 U.S. Post Office and Courthouse (disambiguation)
 U.S. Post Office and Customhouse (disambiguation)

References

External links
 United States Postal Service Locator

 
Post Office

de:U.S. Post Office